Garndiffaith railway station (Six Bells) served the village of Garndiffaith, located in Torfaen, south east Wales. Build by the London and North Western Railway (LNWR) as an expansion for the Brynmawr and Blaenavon Railway to meet the Great Western Railway (GWR) at Abersychan and Talywain.

History 

The halt originally opened as Six Bells in 1912; it was renamed as Garndiffaith in 1922. Passenger use ceased during the Second World War, though the line was still in use for coal trains until closure in 1980.

The station site today 

A cycle path has since been built on the line and through the site of the former station, part of the National Cycle Network Route 46.

Reopening the station to the public has become one of the long-term aims of the preserved Pontypool and Blaenavon Railway, whom aim to rebuild the station, as part of its expansion plans.

References

External links
 Pontypool and Blaenavon Railway's overall development plan
 Railway Stations & Public Houses in Great Britain and Ireland

Disused railway stations in Torfaen
History of Monmouthshire
Former London and North Western Railway stations
Railway stations in Great Britain opened in 1912
Railway stations in Great Britain closed in 1941